Tovar Municipality is a municipality in Mérida State, Venezuela. The population of Tovar measured by the 2013 census was 41,867. It is the birthplace of Major League Baseball player, Johan Santana.

People native to Tovar are referred to as Tovareños. There is a recent movement to preserve some vintage photos of the town and its people.

References

Municipalities of Mérida (state)